Alain Le Vern (born 8 May 1948) is a French politician. He served as a member of the French Senate and the president of the Upper Normandy region between 1998 and 2013. He is also the inaugural President of the transnational Arc Manche Assembly.

He was elected president of Upper Normandy in 1998 and Senator representing the Seine-Maritime department in 2007. He became the first President of the Arc Manche Assembly, elected in 2005.

References

External links
 Channel-Arc-Manche official website

1948 births
Living people
Presidents of French regions and overseas collectivities
Socialist Party (France) politicians
Senators of Seine-Maritime
Politicians from Normandy
People from Finistère
French people of Breton descent